Neumarkter Passionsspiele is a theatre festival in Neumarkt in der Oberpfalz, Bavaria, Germany.

Theatre festivals in Germany